Shaft is an album led by jazz drummer Bernard Purdie which was recorded for the Prestige label in 1971.

Reception

Stewart Mason of Allmusic states, "these limp retreads, apparently aimed at a middle-of-the-road audience that was reaching for hipness but didn't want to be confronted with anything too out there, are utterly unnecessary. There are a handful of good tunes here; although it's unclear what the genial funk groove "Attica" has to do with the 1971 prison riot of the same name, it's got some hot tenor sax solos and a rollicking electric piano solo by composer Neal Creque. Similarly, the mellow and soulful "Summer Melody" has some exquisite electric piano and trumpet over its gentle conga-led groove. An album' s worth of variations on these two themes would have been a minor soul-jazz classic, but unfortunately, Bernard Purdie's overreaching ends up giving him the, um, Shaft".

Track listing
 "Shaft" (Isaac Hayes) - 5:52
 "Way Back Home" (Wilton Felder) - 5:30
 "Attica" (Neal Creque) - 4:12
 "Changes" (Buddy Miles) - 4:52
 "Summer Melody" (Harold Ousley) - 6:35
 "Butterfingers" (Willie Bridges) - 4:12

Personnel
Bernard Purdie - drums
Danny Moore, Gerry Thomas - trumpet
Willie Bridges, Charlie Brown, Houston Person - tenor saxophone
Neal Creque - electric piano
Billy Nichols,  Lloyd Davis - guitar
Gordon Edwards - electric bass
Norman Pride - congas

Production
 Bob Porter - producer
 Rudy Van Gelder - engineer

Sample use

 "Changes" has been sampled in "Block Rockin' Beats" by The Chemical Brothers, from their 1997 album Dig Your Own Hole, and in "Chiron" by Four Tet, from his first album Dialogue (1999).

References

Bernard Purdie albums
1973 albums
Prestige Records albums
Albums produced by Bob Porter (record producer)
Albums recorded at Van Gelder Studio